The Starr Historic District is a neighborhood of historic buildings and national historic district located at Richmond, Wayne County, Indiana.  The district encompasses 102 contributing buildings in a predominantly residential section of Richmond.  It developed between about 1853 and 1915 and includes representative examples of Greek Revival, Italianate, Second Empire, and Queen Anne style architecture. Included in the district is a former Hicksite Quaker Meeting House, now the Wayne County Historical Museum and the Reid Memorial Presbyterian Church and Andrew F. Scott House.  Other notable buildings include the Miller-Mendenhall House (1875), Dickinson Log House (1825), Starr-Cadwalader House (1861), and Clem Gaar House (1883).

Two houses in the District were the former residences of Orville and Wilbur Wright, during their childhood. A long-gone garage at the back of one of these houses was the location of their first bicycle repair 'shop'. This info was reprinted from a Richmond Palladium-Item article.

The district was added to the National Register of Historic Places in 1974.

See also 
 Old Richmond Historic District
 Richmond Railroad Station Historic District
 Reeveston Place Historic District
 East Main Street-Glen Miller Park Historic District
 Richmond Downtown Historic District

References

External links

 Starr District information and photos from Waynet.org

Historic American Buildings Survey in Indiana
Historic districts on the National Register of Historic Places in Indiana
Italianate architecture in Indiana
Queen Anne architecture in Indiana
Greek Revival architecture in Indiana
Second Empire architecture in Indiana
Historic districts in Richmond, Indiana
National Register of Historic Places in Wayne County, Indiana